Hell Destroyer is the fourth album by the heavy metal band Cage.

Critical reception 

Mark Gromen of Brave Words praised the album saying "Easily my favourite Cage disc since Unveiled!" Scott Alisoglu of Blabbermouth.net stated "Heavy metal concept albums are hit or miss propositions.....There are very few albums that can claim to be as quintessentially heavy metal as Hell Destroyer.

Steen of RevelationZ felt the album to be lovingly crafted and perfected down to the very last note.

Michael Wuensch of Lastrit.es stated "2007 has seen a number of traditional metal bands releasing top-ten contenders, but the power end of the spectrum has been relatively quiet. There's been a few challengers but Cage has definitely delivered a paragon in spades with this release.''

Track listing

Personnel 
Cage
 Sean Peck – vocals, executive producer
 Dave Garcia – guitars, keyboards, executive producer
 Anthony Wayne McGinnis – guitars
 Michael Giordano – bass
 Mikey Niel – drums

Production
 Richard Carr – producer, engineering, recording
 Gavin Lurssen – mastering
 Gabriel Wallach – mastering
 Marc Sasso – cover art, layout, design

References 

2007 albums
Cage (band) albums
Thrash metal albums by American artists